Fred R. Milanovich (March 3, 1915 – May 13, 1997) was a Democratic member of the Pennsylvania House of Representatives.

References

Democratic Party members of the Pennsylvania House of Representatives
1915 births
1997 deaths
20th-century American politicians